The outcome (in %) of the Turkish local elections after 1980 is shown below. (In 1981 all parties were closed by the military rule. For local elections before 1980 see Turkish local elections before 1980.).  In the local elections in addition to mayors and muhtars, members of local parliaments are elected. The voter base of the local parliaments and the national parliament is assumed to be identical. In the table, only those parties which received more than 1% are shown.

Legend of abbreviations 
ANAP: Motherland Party (later on merged into True Path Party)
SODEP:Social Democracy Party (later on merged with People’s Party)
DYP:True Path Party (later on renamed Democratic Party)
HP:People’s Party (later on merged with SODEP)
MDP:Nationalist Democracy Party
RP:Welfare Party
FP:Virtue Party
SHP:Social Democrat People’s Party (result of SODEP-HP, later itself merged with CHP)
CHP:Issued from SHP (later on merged with SHP)
DSP:Democratic Left Party
MHP:Nationalist Movement Party (actually in 1989 National Task Party)
BBP:Great Union Party
HADEP:People’s Democracy Party(In 2004 as a coalition with SHP (not to be confused with SHP above))
DTP:Democratic Society Party
AKP:Justice and Development Party
SP:Felicity Party
GP:Young Party

See also 
Turkish general elections after 1980

References

1981
Local, 1980+